Utley is an unincorporated community in Athens County, in the U.S. state of Ohio.

History
A post office called Utley was established in 1886, and remained in operation until 1909. Utley originally was a mining community.

References

Unincorporated communities in Athens County, Ohio
1886 establishments in Ohio
Populated places established in 1886
Unincorporated communities in Ohio